A fiscal agent, fiscal sponsor, or financial agent is a proxy that manages fiscal matters on behalf of another party. A fiscal agent may assist in the redemption of bonds or coupons at maturity, disbursing dividends, and handling tax issues. For example, the United States Federal Reserve is the fiscal agent of the federal government of the United States.

Banking
Tax